Clinical Child and Family Psychology Review is a quarterly peer-reviewed scientific journal which publishes review articles in the fields of clinical, child, and family psychology. It was established in 1998 and is published by Springer Science+Business Media. The editors-in-chief are Ronald J. Prinz (University of South Carolina) and Thomas Ollendick (Virginia Polytechnic Institute and State University). According to the Journal Citation Reports, the journal has a 2020 impact factor of 5.574.

References

External links

Clinical psychology journals
Developmental psychology journals
Publications established in 1998
Review journals
Springer Science+Business Media academic journals
Quarterly journals
English-language journals